Eusebio "Eddie" Razo Jr. (January 21, 1966 – April 24, 2012) was a Mexican-born American jockey.

Razo rode for three years in his native Mexico before arriving in the United States in 1983. Up until his death he had won 2,962 races from 24,270 starts, and his horses had earned $64,011,843 in purses.

Razo spent most of his career at the Chicago area tracks: Arlington Park, Hawthorne Race Course and Sportsman's Park when the latter raced thoroughbreds.

Razo died in an explosion and garage fire at his home in Long Grove, Illinois, on April 24, 2012. He was 46.

References

External links
Eusebio Razo, Jr. at equibase.com
Eusebio Razo, Jr.  at breederscup.com

Year-end charts

1966 births
2012 deaths
Mexican jockeys
American jockeys
Sportspeople from Illinois
People from Long Grove, Illinois
Deaths from fire in the United States
Accidental deaths in Illinois
Sportspeople from Mexico City
Mexican emigrants to the United States
American sportspeople of Mexican descent